Rassul Kaliyev (born 16 June 1991) is a freestyle wrestler from Kazakhstan. In Incheon, South Korea, he won the silver medal in the men's freestyle 57 kg category, after losing to Jong Hak-jin of North Korea in the 2014 Asian Games. He also won the silver medal in the Ali Aliyev International Freestyle Wrestling Tournament held in Makhachkala.

References

Asian Games medalists in wrestling
Kazakhstani male sport wrestlers
Wrestlers at the 2014 Asian Games
1991 births
Living people
Asian Games silver medalists for Kazakhstan
Medalists at the 2014 Asian Games
21st-century Kazakhstani people